Amunda are a rock band from Alice Springs formed in 1985. The band's name is based on Mbantua, the Arrernte word for meeting place, which is associated with the spring at Heavitree Gap in the MacDonnell Ranges at Alice Springs.

In 1992 they played at the Adelaide Fringe Festival, in 1995 the Port Fairy Folk Festival and in 1996 the band played at the Adelaide and Sydney legs of the Big Day Out. They have supported  bands including Cruel Sea, Weddings Parties Anything, Ed Kuepper and Things of Stone and Wood.

Members
 Paul Ah Chee – vocals/guitar
 Rachel Perkins – vocals
 Stanley Satour – vocals/bass guitar
 Gerry Laughton – vocals/lead guitar
 Nick Guggisberg – vocals/drums
 Daniel Plain – drums/vocals
 Bill Davis – keyboards
 Kusha Homer – backing vocals
 Rhonda Ross – backing vocals

Discography

Studio albums
Better Late Than Never (1989) – Amunda
Civilised World (1992) – CAAMA/Larrikin
Pedlar Ave (1995) EP – Stunt

Compilation albums (contributing artist)
Beat the Grog (1988) – CAAMA ("Wonder What". Also includes "Ain't No Use In That" by Paul Ah Chee and "Who's Goin' Wipe Their Tears" by Daniel Plain)
AIDS: How Could I Know (1989) – CAAMA ("How Could I Know")
Sing Loud, Play Strong (1990) – CAAMA ("1788")
From the Bush (1990) – CAAMA ("Alice Don't Grow So Fast")
From the Bush II (1992) – CAAMA ("Heart Beat")
Our Home, Our Land (1995) – CAAMA ("Climbing The Mountain")
25th Anniversary Compilation (2006) – CAAMA ("Climbing The Mountain")

References

External links
Cultural Dissent, Green Left Weekly issue #74 7 October 1992 Music from the red heart

Northern Territory musical groups
Indigenous Australian musical groups